Lawrence William Sharp (25 August 1935 – 7 November 1974) was an Australian rules footballer who played in the VFL between 1954 and 1957 for the Richmond Football Club and then in 1959 for the South Melbourne Football Club.

References 

 Hogan P: The Tigers Of Old, Richmond FC, Melbourne 1996

External links
 
 

Richmond Football Club players
Sydney Swans players
Jack Dyer Medal winners
East Ballarat Football Club players
Australian rules footballers from Melbourne
1935 births
1974 deaths
People from Carlton, Victoria